Beech mast may refer to:

The nuts of the beech tree (Fagus)
A season of high seed production by the southern beech (Nothofagus)